Mónica Martín (born 21 June 1976) is a Spanish gymnast. She competed at the 1996 Summer Olympics, where she finished 17th in the individual all around final.

References

External links
 

1976 births
Living people
Spanish female artistic gymnasts
Olympic gymnasts of Spain
Gymnasts at the 1996 Summer Olympics
Sportspeople from Gijón